Cryptogemma japonica is a species of sea snail, a marine gastropod mollusk in the family Turridae.

Description

Distribution
This marine species occurs off Japan.

References

 Hasegawa K. & Okutani T. (2011) A review of bathyal shell-bearing gastropods in Sagami Bay. Memoirs of the National Sciences Museum, Tokyo 47: 97–144.

External links
 

japonica
Gastropods described in 1964